Galvani was an Italian physician and physicist who lived and died in Bologna.

Galvani may also refer to:

People
 Galvani (surname)

Other uses
 10184 Galvani, a main-belt asteroid
 Galvani (crater), a lunar crater that lies close to the northwestern limb of the moon